Parker v South Eastern Railway [1877] 2 CPD 416 is a famous English contract law case on exclusion clauses where the court held that an individual cannot escape a contractual term by failing to read the contract but that a party wanting to rely on an exclusion clause must take reasonable steps to bring it to the attention of the customer.

Facts
Mr Parker left a bag in the cloakroom of Charing Cross railway station, run by the South Eastern Railway Company. On depositing his bag and paying two pence he received a ticket. On the front it said "see back". On its back, it stated that the railway was excluded from liability for items worth £10 or more. Mr Parker failed to read the clause as he thought the ticket was only a receipt of payment. However, he admitted that he knew the ticket contained writing. Mr Parker's bag, which was worth more than £10, was lost. He sued the company. The question of law put to the court was whether the clause applied to Mr Parker. At trial the jury found for Mr Parker as it was reasonable for him not to read the ticket.

Judgment

Divisional Court
Lord Coleridge CJ, Brett J and Lindley J decided in favour of Mr Parker, upholding the jury award. Lindley J remarked,

Court of Appeal
The majority of the Court of Appeal held there should be a retrial. They said that if Mr Parker knew of the conditions he would be bound. If he did not know, he would still be bound if he was given the ticket in such a way as amounted to "reasonable notice". Mellish LJ said the following.

Baggallay LJ concurred, and predicted that the same result would be reached by the jury (in Mr Parker's favour). Bramwell LJ dissented, holding that reasonable notice should be a question of law, and that held have decided in favour of the railway company.

See also
Chapelton v Barry UDC [1940]
Olley v Marlborough Court Hotel (1949) another famous exclusion case
Thornton v Shoe Lane Parking Ltd
George Mitchell v Finney Lock Seeds Ltd

Notes

1877 in case law
Baron Bramwell cases
English incorporation case law
Lord Lindley cases
1877 in British law
Court of Appeal (England and Wales) cases
Railway litigation in 1877